University Club Tower may refer to:
 University Club Tower (Milwaukee) in Milwaukee, Wisconsin
 University Club Tower (Tulsa) in Tulsa, Oklahoma

See also
 University Club (disambiguation)